Costanzo is an Italian given name, translated from the Latin name Constantius. It is also used as an, originally patronymic, surname. It may refer to:

People with the surname Costanzo
Alessandra Costanzo
Alfredo Costanzo
Angelo Costanzo
Blake Costanzo
Claudio Costanzo
Filumena Costanzo
Francisco Costanzo
Franco Costanzo
Gerald Costanzo
Jack Costanzo
Jodine Costanzo
Lawrence G. Costanzo
Marc Costanzo
Maurizio Costanzo
Moreno Costanzo
Paulo Costanzo
Robert Costanzo
San Costanzo
Saverio Costanzo
Sharon Costanzo

People with the given name Costanzo
Costanzo Festa
Costanzo Porta
Costanzo Ciano
Costanzo Preve
Costanzo Varolio

See also
Constanzo
Costanza (disambiguation)
Francesco Costanzo Cattaneo (1602–1665), Italian painter
Villar San Costanzo, a municipality in the Province of Cuneo, Italy
San Costanzo may refer, in Italian, to any one of the numerous saints named Constantius

Italian masculine given names
Italian-language surnames
Patronymic surnames